Events from the year 1861 in Germany.

Incumbents
 King of Bavaria – Ludwig II
 King of Hanover – George V
 King of Prussia – William I
 King of Saxony – John
 King of Württemberg – William I of Württemberg
 Grand Duke of Baden – Frederick I

Events
 2 January – Frederick William IV of Prussia dies and is succeeded by Wilhelm I.
 15 April – Watchmaker Junghans is founded.
 6 June – German Progress Party (Deutsche Fortschrittspartei) is founded as Germany's first modern political party by liberal members of the Prussian House of Representatives in opposition to Bismarck.
 1 July- Wallraf–Richartz Museum opened in Cologne
 11 July – German Shooting and Archery Federation is founded in Gotha.
 14 July – Osckar Becker attempts assassination of William I of Prussia in Baden-Baden.
 7 August – Allgemeiner Deutscher Musikverein founded by Franz Liszt and Franz Brendel.
 15 August – First description of Archaeopteryx, based on a feather found in Bavaria;<ref>{{cite journal|last1=Meyer|first1=Hermann von|authorlink=Christian Erich Hermann von Meyer|title=Vogel-Federn und Palpipes priscus von Solenhofen|journal=Neues Jahrbuch für Mineralogie, Geognosie, Geologie und Petrefaktenkunde|date=1861-08-15|page=561|url=https://books.google.com/books?id=6RAFAAAAQAAJ&pg=PA561|trans-title=Bird feathers and Palpipes priscus from Solenhofen|quote=Aus dem lithographischen Schiefer der Brüche von Solenhofen in Bayern ist mir in den beiden Gegenplatten eine auf der Ablösungs- oder Spaltungs-Fläche des Gesteins liegende Versteinerung mitgetheilt worden, die mit grosser Deutlichkeit eine Feder erkennen lässt, welche von den Vogel-Federn nicht zu unterscheiden ist. (From the lithographic slates of the faults of Solenhofen in Bavaria, there has been reported to me a fossil lying on the stone's surface of detachment or cleavage, in both opposing slabs, which can be recognized with great clarity [to be] a feather, which is indistinguishable from a bird's feather.)}}</ref> in September the first complete identified skeleton is found near Langenaltheim.
 1 October – Newspaper Deutsche Allgemeine Zeitung begins daily publication as Nord-deutsche Allgemeine Zeitung''.
 Date unknown – Museum Godeffroy in Hamburg is founded.

Births
 2 January – Wilhelm Bölsche, writer (died 1939)
 30 January – Charles Martin Loeffler, violist (died 1937 in the United States)
 4 February – Franz Winter, archaeologist (died 1930)
 17 February – Princess Helena of Waldeck and Pyrmont, Duchess of Albany, marries into the British royal family (died 1922 in Austria)
 6 March – Friedrich Eckenfelder, painter (died 1938)
 21 March – Charles Swickard, silent film director (died 1929 in the United States)
 14 May – Harro Magnussen, sculptor (died 1908)
 28 May – Siegfried Czapski, physicist and optician (died 1907)
 19 June – Ludwig Traube, palaeographer (died 1907)
 22 June – Maximilian von Spee, admiral (died 1914)
 16 July – Franz von Blon, composer (died 1945)
 11 September – Erich von Falkenhayn, general (died 1922)
 18 September – Walter Schott, sculptor (died 1938)
 23 September – Robert Bosch, industrialist, engineer and inventor (died 1942)
 24 September – Walter Simons, lawyer and politician (died 1937)
 28 September – Wilhelm Diegelmann, actor (died 1934)
 29 September – Carl Duisberg, chemist and industrialist (died 1935)
 15 October – Eduard Schmid, politician (died 1933)
 20 October – Maximilian Harden, journalist (died 1927)
 10 December
 Karl Groos, philosopher (died 1946)
 Elisabeth von Heyking, novelist and travel diarist (died 1925)
 26 December
 Friedrich Engel, mathematician (died 1941)
 Ludolf von Krehl, internist (died 1937)
 29 December – Kurt Hensel, mathematician (died 1941)

Deaths
 2 January – Frederick William IV of Prussia, King of Prussia from 1840 to 1861 (born 1795)
 21 January – Ernst Friedrich August Rietschel, sculptor (born 1804)
 19 January – Albert Niemann, chemist (born 1834)
 9 February – Karl Otto Ludwig von Arnim, travel writer and playwright (born 1779)
 18 February – Theodor Mügge, writer (born 1802)
 25 October – Friedrich Carl von Savigny, academic lawyer and historian (born 1779)
 26 November – Wilhelm Hensel, painter (born 1794)
 1 December – Heinrich August Hahn, theologian (born 1821)
 18 December – Ernst Anschütz, teacher, organist, poet and composer (born 1780)

References

External links 
 

 
Years of the 19th century in Germany
Germany
Germany